Friedrich Ludwig "Fritz" Bauer (10 June 1924 – 26 March 2015) was a German pioneer of computer science and professor at the Technical University of Munich.

Life 
Bauer earned his Abitur in 1942 and served in the Wehrmacht during World War II, from 1943 to 1945. From 1946 to 1950, he studied mathematics and theoretical physics at Ludwig-Maximilians-Universität in Munich. Bauer received his Doctor of Philosophy (Ph.D.) under the supervision of Fritz Bopp for his thesis Gruppentheoretische Untersuchungen zur Theorie der Spinwellengleichungen ("Group-theoretic investigations of the theory of spin wave equations") in 1952. He completed his habilitation thesis Über quadratisch konvergente Iterationsverfahren zur Lösung von algebraischen Gleichungen und Eigenwertproblemen ("On quadratically convergent iteration methods for solving algebraic equations and eigenvalue problems") in 1954 at the Technical University of Munich. After teaching as a privatdozent at the Ludwig Maximilian University of Munich from 1954 to 1958, he became extraordinary professor for applied mathematics at the University of Mainz. Since 1963, he worked as a professor of mathematics and (since 1972) computer science at the Technical University of Munich. He retired in 1989.

Work 

Bauer's early work involved constructing computing machinery (e.g. the logical relay computer STANISLAUS from 1951–1955). In this context, he was the first to propose the widely used stack method of expression evaluation.

Bauer was a member of the committees that developed the imperative computer programming languages ALGOL 58, and its successor ALGOL 60, important predecessors to all modern imperative programming languages. For ALGOL 58, Bauer was with the German Gesellschaft für Angewandte Mathematik und Mechanik (GAMM, Society of Applied Mathematics and Mechanics) which worked with the American Association for Computing Machinery (ACM). For ALGOL 60, Bauer was with the International Federation for Information Processing (IFIP) IFIP Working Group 2.1 on Algorithmic Languages and Calculi, which specified, maintains, and supports the languages ALGOL 60 and ALGOL 68.

Bauer was an influential figure in establishing computer science as an independent subject in German universities, which until then was usually considered part of mathematics. In 1967, he held the first lecture in computer science at a German university at the Technical University of Munich, titled Information Processing. By 1972, computer science had become an independent academic discipline at the TUM. In 1992, it was separated from the Department of Mathematics to form an independent Department of Informatics, though Bauer had retired from his chair in 1989.

In 1968, he coined the term software engineering which has been in widespread use since, and has become a discipline in computer science.

His scientific contributions spread from numerical analysis (Bauer–Fike theorem) and fundamentals of interpretation and translation of programming languages, to his later works on systematics of program development, especially program transformation methods and systems (CIP-S) and the associated wide-spectrum language system CIP-L. He also wrote a well-respected book on cryptology, Decrypted secrets, now in its fourth edition.

He was the doctoral advisor of 39 students, including Rudolf Berghammer, Manfred Broy, David Gries, Manfred Paul, Gerhard Seegmüller, Josef Stoer, Peter Wynn, and Christoph Zenger.

Friedrich Bauer was one of the 19 founding members of the German Informatics Society. He was editor of the Informatik Spektrum from its founding in 1978, and held that position until his death.

Friedrich Bauer was married to Hildegard Bauer-Vogg. He was the father of three sons and two daughters.

Definition of software engineering 
Bauer was a colleague of the German Representative the NATO Science Committee. In 1967, NATO had been discussing 'The Software Crisis' and Bauer had suggested the term 'Software Engineering' as a way to conceive of both the problem and the solution.

In 1972, Bauer published the following definition of software engineering:

"Establishment and use of sound engineering principles to economically obtain software that is reliable and works on real machines efficiently."

Legacy 

In 2014, the Technical University of Munich renamed their largest lecture hall in the Department of Informatics building after him.

Awards 
 1944: Iron Cross 2nd Class
 1968: Member of the Bavarian Academy of Sciences in mathematics and science class
 1971: Bavarian Order of Merit
 1978: Wilhelm Exner Medal (Austria).
 1982: Federal Merit Cross 1st Class
 1984: Member of the German Academy of Sciences Leopoldina
 1986: Bavarian Maximilian Order for Science and Art
 1987: Honorary Member of the Society for computer science
 1988: Golden Ring of Honour of the German Museum
 1988: IEEE Computer Pioneer Award
 1997: Heinz-Maier-Leibnitz Medal from the Technical University of Munich
 1998: corresponding member of the Austrian Academy of Sciences
 2002: Honorary Member of the Deutsches Museum
 2004: Silver Medal of Merit of the Bavarian Academy of Sciences

Honorary doctorates 
 1974: Honorary Doctor of the University of Grenoble
 1989: Honorary Doctor of the University of Passau
 1998: Honorary doctorate from the Bundeswehr University Munich (Neubiberg)

Publications 
 , a very influential paper on compilers

References

External links 

 Oral history interview with Friedrich L. Bauer, Charles Babbage Institute, University of Minnesota. Bauer discusses his education and early research, including the European side of the development of ALGOL, as well as his later work in numerical analysis and programming languages.
 Photograph of Friedrich L. Bauer (provided by Brian Randell)
 Bauer about Rutishauser at a symposium at the ETH Zürich in 2002
 
 Author profile in the database zbMATH

1924 births
2015 deaths
German computer scientists
20th-century German mathematicians
German historians of mathematics
People from Regensburg
Programming language designers
Software engineering researchers
Computer science educators
Academic staff of the Technical University of Munich
Ludwig Maximilian University of Munich alumni
Officers Crosses of the Order of Merit of the Federal Republic of Germany
21st-century German mathematicians
Members of the Austrian Academy of Sciences
German military personnel of World War II